Paula Dufter (born 29 August 1950) is a German speed skater. She competed at the 1968 Winter Olympics and the 1972 Winter Olympics.

References

External links
 

1950 births
Living people
German female speed skaters
Olympic speed skaters of West Germany
Speed skaters at the 1968 Winter Olympics
Speed skaters at the 1972 Winter Olympics
People from Traunstein (district)
Sportspeople from Upper Bavaria